SS Louis Bamberger was a Liberty ship built in the United States during World War II. She was named after Louis Bamberger, a businessman and philanthropist, noted for co-founding, with his sister Caroline Bamberger Fuld, the Institute for Advanced Study in Princeton, New Jersey.

Construction
Louis Bamberger was laid down on 28 October 1944, under a Maritime Commission (MARCOM) contract, MC hull 2508, by the St. Johns River Shipbuilding Company, Jacksonville, Florida; she was sponsored by Mrs. George H. Barber, the wife of a War Shipping Administration (WSA) official, and was launched on 29 November 1944.

History
She was allocated to the Weyerhaeuser Steamship Company, on 31 October 1944. She was sold for commercial use, 31 October 1947, to the Weyerhaeuser Steamship Company, she was renamed the SS SS Horace Irvine, to transport Weyerhaeuser lumber goods.

References

Bibliography

 
 
 
 

 

Liberty ships
Ships built in Jacksonville, Florida
1944 ships